Kuchinda College is a college located in Odisha, India.

Campus
Kuchinda College, established in the year 1964, is located in the city of Kuchinda, the seat of the eponymous subdivision in Sambalpur district in Odisha.

As of 2018, the principal of the college is Dr. Ranjan Kumar Mohapatra.

Departments 
As of 2016, there are fifteen departments in Kuchinda College:
 Department of Botany
 Department of Chemistry
 Department of Commerce
 Department of Economics
 Department of Education
 Department of English
 Department of History
 Department of Information Technology
 Department of Logic & Philosophy
 Department of Mathematics
 Department of Odia
 Department of Physical Education
 Department of Physics
 Department of Political Science
 Department of Zoology

References

Universities and colleges in Odisha
Education in Sambalpur district
Educational institutions established in 1964
1964 establishments in Orissa